Gonzalo Lama was the defending champion, but lost to Fernando Romboli in the quarterfinals.

Romboli won the tournament defeating Giovanni Lapentti in the final, 4−6, 6−3, 6−2.

Seeds

Draw

Finals

Top half

Bottom half

References
 Main Draw
 Qualifying Draw

Seguros Bolivar Open Cali - Singles